Bhale Jodi may refer to:
 Bhale Jodi (1970 film), an Indian Kannada-language drama film
 Bhale Jodi (2016 film), an Indian Kannada-language romantic comedy film